Six Principles can refer to:

 Six principles of Chinese painting established by Xie He in the 6th century. 
 General Six-Principle Baptists, the oldest Baptist denomination in the Americas, dating to the 17th century.
 The six principles established by Global Greens Charter by 800 delegates from the Green parties of 70 countries in 2001.